In George Gurdjieff's Fourth Way school of thought, Earth Level or Planet Level refers to the level of the Law of Forty-eight on the Ray of Creation, meaning that forty-eight laws govern it.

It corresponds to the Gurdjieff hydrogen number 48 and the musical note mi. Moon Level precedes it and All Planets Level follows it.

See also
 48 (number)

Fourth Way terminology